Harry Robert Joseph Comer (January 20, 1912 – March 15, 1990) was a Democratic member of the Pennsylvania House of Representatives.

Formative years
Harry Robert Joseph Comer was born in Philadelphia, Pennsylvania on January 20, 1912. During World War II, he served as a corporal with the U.S. Army. As an adult, he was employed as an insurance broker and real estate agent.

Political career
A Democrat, he was appointed as the chair of Philadelphia's 33rd Ward Democratic Executive Committee. Elected to the Pennsylvania House of Representatives in 1953, he served 10 consecutive terms, during which time he represented Philadelphia County and was appointed to the Legislative Budget and Finance Committee (1963-1966) and the Pennsylvania Commission on Interstate Cooperation (1969-1974).

After failing in his run for reelection to the Pennsylvania House for its 1975 term, he served as the legislative liaison for the Pennsylvania National Guard from 1974 to 1978.

Death and interment
Comer died in Elkins Park, Montgomery County, Pennsylvania on March 15, 1990, and was interred at the Resurrection Cemetery in Bensalem, Bucks County, Pennsylvania.

References

Democratic Party members of the Pennsylvania House of Representatives
1990 deaths
1912 births
20th-century American politicians
Politicians from Philadelphia